The following is a list of the 33 cantons of the Gironde department, in France, following the French canton reorganisation which came into effect in March 2015:

 Andernos-les-Bains
 Bordeaux-1
 Bordeaux-2
 Bordeaux-3
 Bordeaux-4
 Bordeaux-5
 Le Bouscat
 La Brède
 Cenon
 Les Coteaux de Dordogne
 Créon
 L'Entre-Deux-Mers
 L'Estuaire
 Gujan-Mestras
 Les Landes des Graves
 Le Libournais-Fronsadais
 Lormont
 Mérignac-1
 Mérignac-2
 Le Nord-Gironde
 Le Nord-Libournais
 Le Nord-Médoc
 Pessac-1
 Pessac-2
 Les Portes du Médoc
 La Presqu'île
 Le Réolais et Les Bastides
 Saint-Médard-en-Jalles
 Le Sud-Gironde
 Le Sud-Médoc
 Talence
 La Teste-de-Buch
 Villenave-d'Ornon

References